The 2016–17 Star Hotshots season was the 29th season of the franchise in the Philippine Basketball Association (PBA).

Key dates

2016
 October 14: Star Hotshots head coach Jason Webb was appointed as team consultant. Chito Victolero took over as the Hotshots' head coach.
October 30: The 2016 PBA draft took place at Midtown Atrium, Robinson Place Manila.

Draft picks

Special draft

Regular draft

Roster

Philippine Cup

Eliminations

Standings

Game log

|- style="background:#fcc;"
| 1
| November 20
| San Miguel
| L 88–96
| Mark Barroca (13)
| Lee, Sangalang (10)
| Mark Barroca (4)
| Smart Araneta Coliseum
| 0–1

|- style="background:#fcc;"
| 2
| December 2
| GlobalPort
| L 84–91
| Marc Pingris (19)
| Marc Pingris (8)
| Jio Jalalon (5)
| Smart Araneta Coliseum
| 0–2
|- style="background:#cfc;"
| 3
| December 7
| NLEX
| W 99–75
| Paul Lee (20)
| Marc Pingris (9)
| Paul Lee (7)
| Mall of Asia Arena
| 1–2
|- style="background:#cfc;"
| 4
| December 10
| Phoenix
| W 123–79
| Maliksi, Lee (18)
| Jalalon, Pingris (7)
| Jio Jalalon (7)
| Mall of Asia Arena
| 2–2
|- style="background:#cfc;"
| 5
| December 18
| Rain or Shine
| W 99–91
| Peter June Simon (16)
| Ian Sangalang (9)
| Jio Jalalon (6)
| Smart Araneta Coliseum
| 3–2
|- style="background:#fcc;"
| 6
| December 25
| Barangay Ginebra
| L 79–86
| Paul Lee (20)
| Marc Pingris (16)
| Jio Jalalon (5)
| Philippine Arena
| 3–3

|- style="background:#fcc;"
| 7
| January 11
| Alaska
| L 90–97 (OT)
| Allein Maliksi (15)
| Allein Maliksi (9)
| Paul Lee (4)
| Smart Araneta Coliseum
| 3–4
|- style="background:#cfc;"
| 8
| January 15
| TNT
| W 88–77
| Ian Sangalang (14)
| Marc Pingris (8)
| Mark Barroca (5)
| Smart Araneta Coliseum
| 4–4
|- style="background:#cfc;"
| 9
| January 25
| Blackwater
| W 111–95
| Allein Maliksi (26)
| Ian Sangalang (9)
| Jalalon, Paul Lee (4)
| Cuneta Astrodome
| 5–4
|- style="background:#cfc;"
| 10
| January 28
| Meralco
| W 120–73
| Allein Maliksi (25)
| Pingris, Sangalang (7)
| Paul Lee (5)
| Ynares Center
| 6–4

|- style="background:#cfc;"
| 11
| February 1
| Mahindra
| W 124–87
| Allein Maliksi (33)
| Rafi Reavis (11)
| Jio Jalalon (6)
| Cuneta Astrodome
| 7–4

Playoffs

Bracket

Game log

|- style="background:#cfc;"
| 1
| February 4
| Phoenix
| W 114–83
| Paul Lee (22)
| Marc Pingris (14)
| Lee, Ramos (4)
| Smart Araneta Coliseum
| 1–0
|- style="background:#cfc;"
| 2
| February 6
| Phoenix
| W 91–71
| Paul Lee (17)
| Marc Pingris (9)
| Paul Lee (9)
| Smart Araneta Coliseum
| 2–0

|- style="background:#cfc;"
| 1
| February 9
| Barangay Ginebra
| W 78–74
| Paul Lee (18)
| Marc Pingris (12)
| Marc Pingris (5)
| Smart Araneta Coliseum
| 1–0
|- style="background:#cfc;"
| 2
| February 11
| Barangay Ginebra
| W 91–89
| Paul Lee (17)
| Marc Pingris (8)
| Jalalon, Pingris (5)
| Mall of Asia Arena
| 2–0
|- style="background:#fcc;"
| 3
| February 13
| Barangay Ginebra
| L 62–73
| Marc Pingris (12)
| Marc Pingris (18)
| Mark Barroca (4)
| Mall of Asia Arena
| 2–1
|- style="background:#fcc;"
| 4
| February 15
| Barangay Ginebra
| L 86–93
| Allein Maliksi (18)
| Marc Pingris (13)
| Lee, Pingris (2)
| Smart Araneta Coliseum
| 2–2
|- style="background:#cfc;"
| 5
| February 17
| Barangay Ginebra
| W 89–80
| Rafi Reavis (17)
| Rafi Reavis (13)
| Mark Barroca (7)
| Mall of Asia Arena
| 3–2
|- style="background:#fcc;"
| 6
| February 19
| Barangay Ginebra
| L 67–91
| Marc Pingris (14)
| Marc Pingris (10)
| Mark Barroca (4)
| Smart Araneta Coliseum`18,642
| 3–3
|- style="background:#fcc;"
| 7
| February 21
| Barangay Ginebra
| L 76–89
| Allein Maliksi (22)
| Pingris, Ramos (8)
| Marc Pingris (6)
| Mall of Asia Arena20,221
| 3–4

Commissioner's Cup

Eliminations

Standings

Game log

|- style="background:#cfc;"
| 1
| March 22
| Phoenix
| W 101–82
| Tony Mitchell (24)
| Tony Mitchell (16)
| Jio Jalalon (4)
| Smart Araneta Coliseum
| 1–0
|- style="background:#cfc;"
| 2
| March 25
| GlobalPort
| W 103–77
| Tony Mitchell (22)
| Tony Mitchell (17)
| Paul Lee (6)
| Mindanao Civic Center
| 2–0
|- style="background:#cfc;"
| 3
| March 29
| NLEX
| W 105–103
| Allein Maliksi (24)
| Tony Mitchell (15)
| Jalalon, Lee (4)
| Smart Araneta Coliseum
| 3–0

|- style="background:#cfc;"
| 4
| April 5
| Mahindra
| W 97–83
| Tony Mitchell (19)
| Tony Mitchell (14)
| Paul Lee (5)
| Smart Araneta Coliseum
| 4–0
|- style="background:#fcc;"
| 5
| April 9
| Barangay Ginebra
| L 98–113
| Tony Mitchell (22)
| Tony Mitchell (9)
| Jio Jalalon (6)
| Mall of Asia Arena
| 4–1
|- style="background:#fcc;"
| 6
| April 16
| San Miguel
| L 97–103
| Tony Mitchell (22)
| Rafi Reavis (13)
| Jio Jalalon (5)
| Smart Araneta Coliseum
| 4–2
|- style="background:#cfc;"
| 7
| April 22
| Blackwater
| W 96–90
| Tony Mitchell (17)
| Tony Mitchell (15)
| Barroca, Lee (5)
| Mall of Asia Arena
| 5–2
|- align="center"
|colspan="9" bgcolor="#bbcaff"|All-Star Break

|- style="background:#cfc;"
| 8
| May 6
| Rain or Shine
| W 99–93
| Paul Lee (23)
| Tony Mitchell (18)
| Mark Barroca (9)
| Batangas City Coliseum
| 6–2
|- style="background:#cfc;"
| 9
| May 10
| TNT
| W 107–97
| Ricardo Ratliffe (37)
| Ricardo Ratliffe (22)
| Barroca, Lee (5)
| Mall of Asia Arena
| 7–2
|- style="background:#cfc;"
| 10
| May 24
| Meralco
| W 108–90
| Ricardo Ratliffe (32)
| Ricardo Ratliffe (13)
| Justin Melton (5)
| Smart Araneta Coliseum
| 8–2
|- style="background:#cfc;"
| 11
| May 31
| Alaska
| W 102–98 (OT)
| Ricardo Ratliffe (35)
| Ricardo Ratliffe (28)
| Jio Jalalon (6)
| Cuneta Astrodome
| 9–2

Playoffs

Bracket

Game log

|- style="background:#cfc;" 
| 1
| June 5 
| Rain or Shine 
| W 118–82
| Ricardo Ratliffe (29)
| Ricardo Ratliffe (8)
| Paul Lee (10)
| Smart Araneta Coliseum 
| 1–0
|- style="background:#cfc;" 
| 2
| June 7 
| Rain or Shine 
| W 84–69
| Ricardo Ratliffe (26)
| Ricardo Ratliffe (24)
| Ricardo Ratliffe (5)
| Smart Araneta Coliseum 
| 2–0

|- style="background:#cfc;" 
| 1
| June 10 
| San Miguel 
| W 109–105
| Maliksi, Ratliffe (26)
| Ricardo Ratliffe (21)
| Paul Lee (8)
| Smart Araneta Coliseum 
| 1–0
|- style="background:#fcc;" 
| 2 
| June 12 
| San Miguel 
| L 76–77
| Ricardo Ratliffe (25)
| Ricardo Ratliffe (35)
| Melton, Ratliffe (3)
| Mall of Asia Arena 
| 1–1
|- style="background:#fcc;" 
| 3
| June 14 
| San Miguel 
| L 110–111
| Ricardo Ratliffe (44)
| Ricardo Ratliffe (19)
| Ricardo Ratliffe (7)
| Smart Araneta Coliseum 
| 1–2
|- style="background:#fcc;" 
| 4
| June 16 
| San Miguel 
| L 102–109
| Ricardo Ratliffe (36)
| Ricardo Ratliffe (17)
| Mark Barroca (6)
| Mall of Asia Arena 
| 1–3

Governors' Cup

Eliminations

Standings

Game log

|- style="background:#cfc;" 
| 1
| July 23
| Blackwater 
| W 103–86
| Peter June Simon (20)
| Cinmeon Bowers (8)
| Mark Barroca (7)
| Smart Araneta Coliseum 
| 1–0
|- style="background:#cfc;" 
| 2
| July 28
| Alaska 
| W 101–92
| Malcolm Hill (28)
| Malcolm Hill (11)
| Paul Lee (5)
| Ynares Center 
| 2–0

|- style="background:#cfc;" 
| 3
| August 4
| San Miguel 
| W 104–98
| Malcolm Hill (20)
| Ian Sangalang (11)
| Mark Barroca (7)
| Smart Araneta Coliseum 
| 3–0
|- style="background:#cfc;" 
| 4
| August 23
| Phoenix 
| W 100–81
| Malcolm Hill (20)
| Hill, Ramos (8)
| three players (4)
| Smart Araneta Coliseum 
| 4–0
|- style="background:#fcc;" 
| 5
| August 27
| Rain or Shine 
| L 88–92
| Malcolm Hill (26)
| Malcolm Hill (20)
| three players (3)
| Smart Araneta Coliseum 
| 4–1

|- style="background:#fcc;" 
| 6
| September 3
| Barangay Ginebra 
| L 101–105 (OT)
| Malcolm Hill (28)
| Malcolm Hill (12)
| Mark Barroca (4)
| Smart Araneta Coliseum 
| 4–2
|- style="background:#fcc;"
| 7
| September 9
| Meralco
| L 90–96
| Malcolm Hill (28)
| Malcolm Hill (10)
| Jio Jalalon (7)
| Sta. Rosa Multi-Purpose Complex
| 4–3
|- style="background:#cfc;"
| 8
| September 15
| GlobalPort
| W 109–83
| Malcolm Hill (32)
| Malcolm Hill (12)
| Malcolm Hill (5)
| Smart Araneta Coliseum
| 5–3
|- style="background:#fcc;" 
| 9
| September 17
| TNT
| L 99–104
| Kristófer Acox (18)
| Kristófer Acox (18)
| Jio Jalalon (8)
| Ynares Center 
| 5–4
|- style="background:#cfc;" 
| 10
| September 22
| Kia
| W 128–81
| Kristófer Acox (19)
| Kristófer Acox (15)
| Jio Jalalon (7)
| Mall of Asia Arena 
| 6–4
|- style="background:#cfc;" 
| 11
| September 24
| NLEX
| W 101–93
| Peter June Simon (16)
| Kristófer Acox (10)
| Marc Pingris (6)
| Smart Araneta Coliseum 
| 7–4

Playoffs

Bracket

Game log

|- style="background:#cfc;"
| 1
| September 26
| NLEX
| W 89–77
| Kristófer Acox (21)
| Kristófer Acox (12)
| Marc Pingris (5)
| Mall of Asia Arena
| 1–0

|- style="background:#fcc;" 
| 1
| October 1
| Meralco
| L 66–72
| Jio Jalalon (15)
| Kristófer Acox (16)
| Jalalon, Pingris (3)
| Alonte Sports Arena 
| 0–1
|- style="background:#fcc;" 
| 2
| October 3
| Meralco
| L 74–98
| Mark Barroca (16)
| Kristófer Acox (12)
| Jio Jalalon (3)
| Sta. Rosa Multi-Purpose Complex 
| 0–2
|- style="background:#fcc;" 
| 3
| October 5
| Meralco
| L 88–91 (OT)
| Mark Barroca (21)
| Mark Barroca (12)
| Mark Barroca (8)
| Smart Araneta Coliseum 
| 0–3

Transactions

Trades

Off-Season

Philippine Cup

Recruited imports

Awards

References

Magnolia Hotshots seasons
Star Hotshots season